Pittenweem is a fishing village and civil parish in Fife, on the east coast of Scotland. At the 2001 census, it had a population of 1,747.

Etymology
The name derives from Pictish and Scottish Gaelic.  "Pit-" represents Pictish pett 'place, portion of land', and "-enweem" is Gaelic na h-Uaimh, 'of the Caves' in Gaelic, so "The Place of the Caves".  The name is rendered Baile na h-Uaimh in modern Gaelic, with baile, 'town, settlement', substituted for the Pictish prefix. The cave in question is almost certainly St Fillan's cave.

History
The settlement has existed as a fishing village since early medieval times. The oldest structure, St. Fillan's Cave, dates from the 7th century. An Augustinian priory moved here from the Isle of May in the 13th century, but there was already a church at that time. Pittenweem Parish Church (which is attached to the local tolbooth) has a Norman doorway dating to before 1200. The gatehouse to the east is 15th century. The priory dormitory and refectory was remodelled post-Reformation (1588) to give a new function as a manse. This building was later named the "Great House".

Until 1975 Pittenweem was a royal burgh, having been awarded the status by King James V (1513–42) in 1541.

Founded as a fishing village around a probably early Christian religious settlement, it grew along the shoreline from the west where the sheltered beaches were safe places for fishermen to draw their boats up out of the water. Later a breakwater was built, extending out from one of the rocky skerries that jut out south-west into the Firth of Forth like fingers. This allowed boats to rest at anchor rather than being beached, enabling larger vessels to use the port. A new breakwater further to the east was developed over the years into a deep, safe harbour.

In 1779 John Paul Jones (founder of the American Navy) anchored half-a-mile off Pittenweem in the USS Bonhomme Richard.

There is a feudal Lordship and Barony of Pittenweem created by James VI for Frederick Stewart in 1609. It was held by the Earls of Kellie until it passed to Sir John Anstruther and then to the Bairds of Elie. The current Lord Baron is Claes Zangenberg.

Industry
Pittenweem is currently the most active of the fishing ports in the East Neuk coast of Fife. In the 18th century, Pittenweem had a series of coal mines on the coast between Pittenweem and St Monans.

At one time the village was served by the Fife Coast Railway.

Geography
The village sits astride a raised beach.

Education
Pittenweem Primary School is a traditional village school with its own playing fields on the northern side of the older part of the village. It caters for children aged 4/5 to 11/12. Secondary education (up to ages 16, 17 or 18 depending on educational ambitions) is provided at Waid Academy in the neighbouring town of Anstruther. The nearest private educational institution is St Leonards School in St Andrews, or the High School of Dundee.

Religion

In the Middle Ages, Pittenweem Priory was a small Augustinian monastery linked to that on the Isle of May and built over the ancient sacred cave associated with St Fillan. The cave, which is fitted out as a chapel, was rededicated as a place of worship by the Bishop of St. Andrews in 1935.

Current denominations with churches include: Church of Scotland, Catholic, Episcopalian and Baptist. Other denominations have had churches or the equivalent, but these have been converted to other purposes. The Parish Church Hall, for example, was once "Pittenweem St. Fillan's".

The late 17th to early 18th centuries saw a number of notorious witch-hunts by the local minister. Pittenweem Tolbooth was used as the jail for some of the Pittenweem witches. Five women were severely beaten and one was murdered by a lynch mob.

Culture

In the late 1960s the local fishermen celebrated the re-opening of the re-designed harbour with a Gala Day, when the boats were dressed overall and people could take short trips on the boats. By the early 1980s, however, increasing regulation, higher fuel costs and a shrinking fleet were bringing this event to its knees. In its place in 1982 sprang up an Arts Festival, which initially incorporated the Gala Day as its finale. The Arts Festival has moved on somewhat, however, becoming one of the best-loved art festivals in Scotland with an estimated 25,000 visitors in 2013.  Many artists have re-discovered the charms and the light of the area, which was always popular with itinerant and hobby artists, and have moved to the village, creating a vibrant artistic community.

Pittenweem had the first newspaper in the area – the Pittenweem Register (1844–56).

There is also a fairly well-known song, "Pittenweem Jo", written in 1960.

Much of the 1997 film The Winter Guest was filmed in the village.

Politics
The local Member of the UK Parliament (representing North East Fife) is Wendy Chamberlain of the Liberal Democrats.

The local (representing Fife North East) Member of the Scottish Parliament (MSP) is Willie Rennie of the Scottish Liberal Democrats.

From 1885 to 1983, Pittenweem was part of the East Fife Parliamentary constituency, its most famous MP being Prime Minister H. H. Asquith (Liberal) from 1886 to 1918.

Sport
The local football team is Pittenweem Rovers AFC. The local rugby team is Waid Academy FPRFC.

Notable people
John Douglas, Anglican Bishop of Salisbury
John Smith, clockmaker
Ian Stewart, musician
Frederick Stewart, Lord Pittenweem, local aristocrat
Sir Walter Watson Hughes, public benefactor, founder of the University of Adelaide, South Australia
Wallace Lindsay (Wallace Martin Lindsay), classical scholar, Professor of Humanity at St Andrews University, 1899 to 1937

Gallery

See also
 List of fishing villages
 Moschatel Press

References

 
Villages in Fife
Fishing communities
Fishing communities in Scotland
Parishes in Fife